Mike or Michael Peterson may refer to:

Sportsmen
Michael Peterson (surfer) (1952–2012), Australian 1970s champion
Michael Peterson (rower) (born 1967), American Olympian
Mike Peterson (born 1976), American football linebacker for Atlanta Falcons
Michael Peterson (American football) (born 1982), tight end for Green Bay Packers

Others
Michael Peterson (politician) (1941–2014), American Democratic member of Kansas House of Representatives
Michael Peterson (criminal) (born 1943), American novelist who submitted Alford plea for manslaughter of his second wife, Kathleen Peterson
Michael Gordon Peterson (born 1952), English criminal called "most violent prisoner in Britain" a/k/a Charles Bronson / Charles Salvador
Michael Peterson (singer) (born 1959), American country music singer-songwriter
Michael Peterson (album) in 1997

Characters
Mike Peterson (Marvel Cinematic Universe), cyborg Deathlok from 2013 American TV series Agents of S.H.I.E.L.D.

See also
Michael Pedersen (disambiguation)
Mike Petersen (disambiguation)

Peterson, Michael